Act 1978 is a 2020 Kannada social thriller film directed by Manjunatha Somashekara Reddy (Mansore) and produced by  Devaraj R  This was the first Kannada film to be released in theatres after the COVID-19 pandemic.

Plot 
Geetha, a pregnant widow, goes to a government office as part of her long and continuous ordeal to get money already sanctioned by the government, but kept on the backburner by officials of the concerned department. Tired of being asked for bribes, Geetha takes the violent route to get her due. The movie plays out like a game of chess. What seems to be a normal day of bureaucracy and corruption goes awry when she lands up with a bomb strapped to her stomach.

Cast

Awards and nominations

References 

2020 films
2020s Kannada-language films
Films shot in Karnataka
Indian thriller drama films